Lyulyakovo may refer to the following places in Bulgaria:

 Lyulyakovo, Burgas Province
 Lyulyakovo, Dobrich Province
 Lyulyakovo, Kardzhali Province